A by-election was held for the British House of Commons constituency of Carmarthen on 26 March 1941.  The seat had become vacant on the resignation of the Labour Member of Parliament Major Daniel Hopkin MC, who had held the seat since the 1935 general election.

The Labour candidate, Moelwyn Hughes, was elected unopposed. 
He represented the constituency until his defeat at the 1945 general election.

See also
 1882 Carmarthen Boroughs by-election
 1924 Carmarthen by-election
 1928 Carmarthen by-election
 1957 Carmarthen by-election
 1966 Carmarthen by-election
 Carmarthen (UK Parliament constituency)
 Lists of United Kingdom by-elections

References

Unopposed by-elections to the Parliament of the United Kingdom in Welsh constituencies
1941 elections in the United Kingdom
1941 in Wales
1940s elections in Wales
Elections in Carmarthenshire
20th century in Carmarthenshire